Helmer Andersen Gjedeboe (9 February 1786  – 26 September 1854) was a non-commissioned military officer. He served as a representative at the Norwegian Constitutional Assembly.

Helmer Andersen Gjedeboe was born on the farm Geitbuan at Orkdal in Sør-Trøndelag, Norway.  Helmer Gjedebo began his military career as a soldier in 1804. After he completed his military service in 1818, he ran a shop. In 1824, he received a license as a distiller. He entered public service as police officer in Trondheim from 1838–1850. His former residence  in Trondheim was moved in 1979, rebuilt and opened in the Trondelag Folk Museum (Trøndelag Folkemuseum).

 
He represented the Second Trondhjem Regiment (Trondhjemske Infanteribrigade) at the Norwegian Constituent Assembly in 1814, together with Jacob Erik Lange. At Eidsvoll, he supported the position of the independence party (selvstendighetspartiet).

References

External links
Representantene på Eidsvoll 1814 (Cappelen Damm AS)
 Men of Eidsvoll (eidsvollsmenn)
Trøndelag Folkemuseum website

Related Reading
Holme Jørn (2014) De kom fra alle kanter - Eidsvollsmennene og deres hus  (Oslo: Cappelen Damm) 

1786 births
1854 deaths
People from Orkdal
Norwegian Army personnel
Norwegian military personnel of the Napoleonic Wars
Fathers of the Constitution of Norway